Domenico Nettis (born 6 January 1972) is a retired Italian sprinter who specialized in the 100 metres.

Biography
He won a bronze medal in 4 x 100 metres relay at the 1994 European Championships, together with teammates Ezio Madonia, Domenico Nettis, Giorgio Marras and Sandro Floris.

His personal best 100 metres time is 10.32 seconds, achieved in August 1994 in Rieti. His personal best 200 metres time is 21.06 seconds, achieved in May 1995 in Rieti.

Achievements

See also
 Italy national relay team

References

External links
 

1972 births
Living people
Italian male sprinters
European Athletics Championships medalists